Federico Leardini ((18 September 1979 – 3 February 2018) was an Italian economic journalist.

Early life and education
Born in Venice on 18 September 1979, he moved to Milan in 2000 and here he obtained a degree in political science and a master's degree in international relations.

Career
He began his career as an economic journalist at Class CNBC since 2001.
He worked since 2011 at the information channel Sky TG24 where, in the morning, he managed the chronicle of world stock exchanges.

Death
He suffered a heart attack on 2 February 2018 in the gym in Carate Brianza. Leardini died the following day at Saint Gerardo Hospital in Monza at the age of 38.

See also
Sky TG24

References

1979 births
2018 deaths
Journalists from Milan
Italian male journalists